Pyrausta flavimarginalis is a moth in the family Crambidae. It was described by George Hampson in 1913. It is found in the Democratic Republic of the Congo (North Kivu, Équateur), Kenya and Rwanda.

References

Moths described in 1913
flavimarginalis
Moths of Africa